Yegoshikha Cemetery (Russian: Егошихинское кладбище) is the principal cemetery of the Russian city of Perm. It takes its name from the Yegoshikha River which borders it and was founded in the second half of the 18th century.

Notable graves
 Józef Piotrowski (1840–1923), participant in the January Uprising and an enlightener
 Mikhail Grigorievich Shuisky (1883–1953), opera singer
 Dmitry Dmitriyevich Smyshlyayev (1828–1893), historian, ethnographer and politician
 Pyotr Subbotin-Permyak (1886–1923), avant-garde painter
 Sergei Safronov (fighter pilot) (1930–1960), Soviet fighter pilot

References

External links
 

Cemeteries in Russia
Perm, Russia
Cultural heritage monuments of regional significance in Perm Krai